WEBT (91.5 FM) is a radio station licensed to serve Langdale, Alabama, U.S.

WEBT may also refer to:

Whole Earth Blazar Telescope, an astronomy project 
Webtrends, a company whose NASDAQ stock symbol was WEBT